The name Mahesh (/mahe-sh/) is short version of a name of Sanskrit origin, Maheswara or Umamaheswara, meaning "GREAT RULER " (Mahaa + Ishwar). It is a popular name for Hindu boys as it is one of the names of Shiva.

People with the name include:

Those known by the single name
Mahesh (actor), Indian Malayalam film actor
Mahesh (Tamil actor), Indian Tamil film actor

Sport
 Mahesh Bhupathi (born 1974), Indian tennis player 
 Mahesh Bogahalanda (born 1979), Sri Lankan cricketer
 Mahesh Chhetri (born 1988), Nepali cricketer
 Mahesh Gawli (born 1980), Indian footballer
 Mahesh Hemantha, Sri Lankan cricketer
 Mahesh Mangaonkar (born 1994), Indian squash player
 Mahesh Rawat (born 1985), Indian cricketer
 Mahesh Rodrigo (1928 - 2011), Sri Lankan cricketer and rugby player
 Yo Mahesh (born 1987), Indian cricketer

Entertainment
 Mahesh Babu (born 1975), Indian film actor
 Mahesh Aney, Indian cinematographer
 Mahesh Bhatt (born 1946), Indian film director, producer and screenwriter
 Mahesh Shetty Indian Television and Film Actor
 Mahesh Dattani (born 1958), Indian director, actor and writer
 Mahesh Elkunchwar (born 1939), Indian playwright
 Mahesh Kothare, Indian actor, director and producer
Mahesh Mahadevan (1955–2002), Indian film music composer
 Mahesh Manjrekar (born 1953), Indian director, actor, writer and producer
 Mahesh Thakur, Indian actor 
Erode Mahesh, Indian actor and television personality

Other
 Maharishi Mahesh Yogi (1917–2008), Indian spiritual leader
 Mahesh Das or Maheshdas Bhat (1528–1586), real name of Birbal, Grand Vizier in the court of Mughal emperor Akbar
 Mahesh Kumar Kanodia (1937 - 2020), Indian politician, member of the 14th Lok Sabha of India
 Mahesh Madhavan (born 1963/64), Indian businessman, CEO of Bacardi 
 Mahesh Rangarajan (born 1964), Indian author and historian

Sanskrit-language names